Soho railway station was a railway station in England, built by the London and North Western Railway on their Stour Valley Line in 1853. It served Soho in the eastern part of Smethwick, and included goods sheds and sidings.

The station was rebuilt on a new site to the west of Soho Street during the 1880s.

The station closed in 1949, although the Rugby-Birmingham-Stafford Loop Line  from the West Coast Main Line still runs through the site of the station today.

There is little evidence of the location of the station on the ground today, and Smethwick Rolfe Street is only a short distance to the west.

References

Disused railway stations in Sandwell
Former London and North Western Railway stations
Railway stations in Great Britain opened in 1853
Railway stations in Great Britain closed in 1949
Smethwick